Jacksboro is a town in Campbell County, Tennessee, United States. The population was 2,020 at the 2010 census, and 2,306 at the 2020 census. It is the county seat of Campbell County.

History

Jacksboro was founded in 1806 as a permanent county seat for the newly created Campbell County.  The initial property for the town square was deeded by Hugh Montgomery, one of the earliest settlers in the area.  The town was originally known as Walnut Grove, but was renamed "Jacksonboro" in honor of Andrew Jackson in 1819.  The name was later shortened to "Jacksboro."

Geography
The town situated near the "corner" of an L-shaped section of Powell Valley created by the intersection of Cumberland Mountain, a long ridge which runs in a northeast-southwest direction, and Cross Mountain, a  summit which rises prominently to the west. Big Creek and Cove Creek — which traverse the eastern and western sections of Jacksboro respectively — are both part of the Norris Lake system of the Clinch River watershed.

Caryville lies to the southwest, and LaFollette lies to the northeast.

Demographics

2020 census

As of the 2020 United States census, there were 2,306 people, 957 households, and 524 families residing in the town.

2000 census
As of the census of 2000, there were 1,887 people, 767 households, and 550 families residing in the town. The population density was 723.0 people per square mile (279.1/km2). There were 827 housing units at an average density of 316.9 per square mile (122.3/km2). The racial makeup of the town was 98.04% White, 0.11% African American, 0.32% Native American, 0.11% Asian, 0.90% from other races, and 0.53% from two or more races. Hispanic or Latino of any race were 1.48% of the population.

There were 767 households, out of which 27.2% had children under the age of 18 living with them, 58.5% were married couples living together, 10.2% had a female householder with no husband present, and 28.2% were non-families. 26.1% of all households were made up of individuals, and 11.7% had someone living alone who was 65 years of age or older. The average household size was 2.34 and the average family size was 2.80.

In the town, the population was spread out, with 19.6% under the age of 18, 9.7% from 18 to 24, 29.8% from 25 to 44, 26.2% from 45 to 64, and 14.7% who were 65 years of age or older. The median age was 39 years. For every 100 females, there were 91.6 males. For every 100 females age 18 and over, there were 91.9 males.

The median income for a household in the town was $29,537, and the median income for a family was $36,607. Males had a median income of $32,708 versus $26,172 for females. The per capita income for the town was $16,150. About 12.2% of families and 18.7% of the population were below the poverty line, including 28.4% of those under age 18 and 14.3% of those age 65 or over.

Notable people
Joseph Alexander Cooper, Union general
Henry R. Gibson, U.S. congressman
Bonnie Hollingsworth, Major League Baseball player
John Jennings, Jr., U.S. congressman
Dennis Powers, Tennessee state representative

References

External links

 Municipal Technical Advisory Service entry for Jacksboro — information on local government, elections, and link to charter

Towns in Campbell County, Tennessee
Towns in Tennessee
County seats in Tennessee
Populated places established in 1808
1808 establishments in Tennessee